Jeffrey Gluckstein (born February 25, 1993) is an American trampoline gymnast. He won the silver medal in the men's individual event at the 2019 Pan American Games held in Lima, Peru.

Personal life 
His older brother Steven Gluckstein is a former trampoline gymnast.

Raised in Atlantic Highlands, New Jersey, he attended Henry Hudson Regional High School.

References

External links 
 

Living people
1993 births
Place of birth missing (living people)
American male trampolinists
Gymnasts from New Jersey
Henry Hudson Regional High School alumni
Pan American Games medalists in gymnastics
Pan American Games silver medalists for the United States
People from Atlantic Highlands, New Jersey

Sportspeople from Monmouth County, New Jersey
Medalists at the 2019 Pan American Games
Gymnasts at the 2019 Pan American Games
Medalists at the Trampoline Gymnastics World Championships
21st-century American people